Henry Dickinson Lindsley (February 28, 1872 – November 18, 1938) was an American businessman who served as the 32nd Mayor of Dallas from 1915 to 1917.

Early life and career
Henry Dickinson Lindsley was born on February 28, 1872, in Nashville, Tennessee, to Philip and Louise Gundry Lindsley. He studied law at Cumberland University in Lebanon, Tennessee, and was admitted to the Texas bar in 1893.

Lindsley bought a controlling interest in Southwestern Life Insurance; served on the boards of Dallas Bank & Trust Company, City National Bank, U.S. Bond & Mortgage Co., and Dallas Title & Guaranty. He worked with others in Dallas to establish Southern Methodist University and obtain funding from the Rockefeller Foundation. With Stephen J. Hay, then mayor, and Charles Bolanz, he approached Adolphus Busch to build a hotel. The Busch Estate invested in Dallas by building the Adolphus Hotel. He bought and subdivided large tracts in North Texas

World War I
Lindsley was commissioned a colonel, serving as Director of the War Risk Insurance Bureau in France. General John J. Pershing awarded him the Distinguished Service Medal for his services as Director of the War Risk Insurance Bureau in France. For his service there, Lindsley was awarded the Commander of the Belgian Order of the Crown by King Albert of Belgium and the Officer of the French Legion of Honor of Marshal Ferdinand Foch.

The American Legion
Along with Theodore Roosevelt, Jr., Lindsley helped organize The American Legion and was honored by the organization with the honorary title, Past National Commander.

Death
Lindsley died November 18, 1938, in Dallas and was interred at Arlington National Cemetery.

Personal life
Lindsley's father was a judge and his maternal uncle, Jacob M. Dickinson, the Secretary of War in President Taft's Cabinet. He married Ruth H. Bower, daughter of Edwin G. Bower, Emily Virginia Scott on December 3, 1892, in Dallas. They had two children: Henry D., Jr. and Kathryn. Lindsley later married Marguerite Berwick, daughter of Oscar E. Berwick and Emma Knauss on May 14, 1936, in Dallas. His grandson, Henry D. Lindsley III, married the granddaughter of Franklin D. Roosevelt, Ruth Chandler Roosevelt.

See also
 List of members of the American Legion

References

External links

 

1872 births
1938 deaths
20th-century American businesspeople
United States Army personnel of World War I
American Freemasons
Burials at Arlington National Cemetery
Commanders of the Order of the Crown (Belgium)
Cumberland University alumni
Mayors of Dallas
Officiers of the Légion d'honneur
Organization founders
Politicians from Nashville, Tennessee
Recipients of the Distinguished Service Medal (US Army)
United States Army officers